Joseph Turner (1746 or 1747 – 3 August 1828) was a British academic and clergyman.

He entered Pembroke College, Cambridge University in 1763 at age 17 and was senior wrangler in 1767.  He received an M.A. in 1770.

He was Master of Pembroke College from 1784 to 1828, and Dean of Norwich from 1790 to 1828.

He was a Vice-Chancellor of Cambridge University in 1785–6 and 1805–6.

His only son was William Hamilton Turner, who became vicar of Banwell, Somerset.

References

External links
 
 

1746 births
1828 deaths
Deans of Norwich
Masters of Pembroke College, Cambridge
Senior Wranglers
Vice-Chancellors of the University of Cambridge
Alumni of Pembroke College, Cambridge